Bogue Flower is a stream in the U.S. state of Mississippi. It is a tributary to Tallahatta Creek.

Bogue Flower is a name derived from the Choctaw language meaning "long creek" (the element "flower" in this context is a corruption of an Indian word).  A variant name is "Bogue Flower Creek".

References

Rivers of Mississippi
Rivers of Lauderdale County, Mississippi
Mississippi placenames of Native American origin